Cyanophrys miserabilis, known generally as the Clench's greenstreak or miserabilis hairstreak, is a species of hairstreak in the butterfly family Lycaenidae. It is found in North America.

The MONA or Hodges number for Cyanophrys miserabilis is 4308.

References

Further reading

 

Cyanophrys
Articles created by Qbugbot
Butterflies described in 1946